The Union for National Progress (UPRONA) is a nationalist political party in Burundi. It initially emerged as a nationalist united front in opposition to Belgian colonial rule but subsequently became an integral part of the one-party state established by Michel Micombero after 1966. Dominated by members of the Tutsi ethnic group and increasingly intolerant to their Hutu counterparts, UPRONA remained the dominant force in Burundian politics until the latter stages of the Burundian Civil War in 2003. It is currently a minor opposition party.

History
UPRONA's most famous Prime Minister and Burundian National Hero is Louis Rwagasore (assassinated in 1961). From that time until 1965, the party also had some Hutu support, and three of its Hutu members, including Pierre Ngendandumwe, became Prime Minister of Burundi. The party was taken over by President Michel Micombero in a coup d'état and became a pillar of the military dictatorships that ruled the country from 1966 to 1993. In 1993, UPRONA placed second in contested elections to Melchior Ndadaye's FRODEBU. Since 1993, in the case of failure to be elected, UPRONA has always made sure to secure the position of Vice President or Prime Minister and some of the top positions in the government.

UPRONA President Pierre Buyoya handed over power to Hutu leader Domitien Ndayizeye of the Front for Democracy in Burundi (a Hutu-based party) on 30 April 2003. At the legislative elections in 2005, the party won 7.2% and 15 out of 118 seats.

During the 2010 elections, UPRONA boycotted councillors' and presidential elections but decided to participate in the legislative elections claiming the need to form an opposition bloc in Parliament and to better compete in the 2015 elections.

Electoral history

Presidential elections

National Assembly elections

Senate elections

External links 

UPRONA official website

Independence movements
Parties of one-party systems
Political parties established in 1960
Political parties in Burundi